The), also called Christkindl, is the traditional Christmas gift-bringer in Austria, Switzerland, southern and western Germany, the Czech Republic, Croatia, Liechtenstein, Luxembourg, the eastern part of Belgium, Portugal, Slovakia, Hungary, parts of northeastern France, Upper Silesia in Poland, parts of Latin America, in certain areas of southern Brazil, and in the Acadiana region of Louisiana.

History

Promulgated by Martin Luther at the Protestant Reformation in 16th–17th-century Europe, many Protestants adopted this gift bringer, the Christ Child or Christkindl, and the date of giving gifts changed from December 6 to Christmas Eve. As such, the "Lutheran Church promoted Christ as the children's gift-giver, hoping to draw attention to the child for whom Christmas was named." The Christkind was adopted in Catholic areas of Germany during the 19th century. To this date, the Christkindl "remains the main gift bringer in many Catholic countries in Latin America."

The Christkind is a sprite-like child, usually depicted with blond hair and angelic wings.  Martin Luther intended it to be a reference to the incarnation of Jesus as an infant (see Christ Child). Sometimes the Christ Child is, instead of the infant Jesus, interpreted as a specific angel bringing the presents, as it appears in some processions together with an image of little Jesus Christ. Later, the Christkind was said to make rounds delivering gifts with St. Nicholas.

Children never see the Christkind in person, and parents tell them that Christkind will not come and bring presents if they are curious and try to spot it. The family enters the living room, where the Christmas tree has been put up, for the opening of presents (the Bescherung), when the parents say that they think that the Christkind who has brought the presents has now left again. In some traditions, the departure is announced by the ringing of a small bell, which the parents pretend to have heard or which is secretly done by one of the adults in the family.

Since the 1990s, the Christkind has faced increasing competition from the Weihnachtsmann, caused by the use of the American version of Santa Claus as an advertising figure. Many traditionalist Catholics in recent times have advocated for the tradition of the Christkind as a "beautiful means of restoring the true meaning of Christmas".

Christkindl or Christkindel are diminutive versions of Christkind. Christkind and Belsnickel are also found among communities of Volga German descent in Argentina. A well-known figure is the Christkind at the Christkindlesmarkt in Nuremberg, which is represented by a young woman chosen every two years for this task.

Christkindl is also a part of the city of Steyr in Austria, named after the allegedly miraculous wax statue of Christkind in the town church.

Czech Ježíšek

Ježíšek (the Baby Jesus) is the Czech-language name for the Christkind Christmas figure. There is no accurate description of Ježíšek. He has been depicted as a baby, toddler, and young lad. Some even consider him simply as an abstract figure. According to tradition, Ježíšek makes his appearance on Christmas Eve. In some families, Ježíšek is said to bring the Christmas tree and the gifts, while the elders do it in secret. In other families, the Christmas tree is decorated collaboratively with the children. Christmas gifts are delivered and unboxed on Christmas Eve (24 December).

The tradition of Ježíšek has been observed by the Czechs for more than 400 years. This is partly due to the large population of Catholics during that period. It was Martin Luther who coined the term during the 16th century, an attempt to provide a suitable name to their figure other than St. Nicholas.

At present, belief in Ježíšek is upheld in modern Czech society, despite having the lowest rates of religious affiliation in the world.

La Christine in Acadiana 
La Christine (also found in the forms La Christiane and La Crisquine) is the Cajun French name for a folkloric figure who traditionally brought "fruits, homemade candies and small gifts" on New Year's Eve. The name represents a Gallicized form of "Christkind" and the tradition was most likely brought to the area by German-speaking settlers from Switzerland. In some families, La Christine would make a visit a week after Papa Noël brought Christmas gifts and might even be described as "Santa Claus' wife", while in others "La Christine" was just another name for Santa Claus.

See also
 Kris Kringle, an Americanized pronunciation and spelling of Christkindl
 Christkindl Markt, a traditional holiday market in Austria, Switzerland, Germany and Eastern France
 List of Christmas and winter gift-bringers by country

References

External links
 
 
 Ježíšek or Santa Claus? - Prague Monitor

Fictional Christian saints
Christmas characters
Christian folklore
Iconography of Jesus
History of Lutheranism
Statues of the infant Jesus
Christmas gift-bringers